Acacia duriuscula is a shrub or tree of the genus Acacia and the subgenus Plurinerves that is endemic to an area of south western Australia.

Description
Like most species of Acacia it has phyllodes rather than true leaves. The evergreen, ascending to erect phyllodes that have a linear to linear-elliptic shape and are straight to shallowly incurved. It blooms from July to October and produces yellow flowers.

Description
It is native to an area in the Wheatbelt and Goldfields-Esperance regions of Western Australia where it is commonly situated among granite outcrops and on plains growing in sandy or sandy loamy granitic soils. It has a scattered distribution from around Mullewa and Paynes Find in the north to around Tammin, Cardunia Rocks and Bromus in the south as a part of scrubland communities usually dominated by various species of Eucalyptus, Acacia or Allocasuarina acutivalvis.

See also
List of Acacia species

References

duriuscula
Acacias of Western Australia
Taxa named by William Vincent Fitzgerald
Plants described in 1904